Aaron Violi is an Australian politician who was elected as the Liberal Party member for the Division of Casey in Victoria in May 2022, succeeding Tony Smith.

Early life and education
Violi was born in Melbourne after his parents emigrated from Italy to Silvan, Victoria in 1953. He was educated at Yarra Glen Primary School and Mount Lilydale Mercy College. He attained a Bachelor of Arts (with Honours) at La Trobe University, then a Masters of Business Administration (MBA) at Deakin University.

Pre-Political Career
After graduating in 2007, Violi commenced work with food manufacturer Yarra Valley Snack Foods, leading the sales team for seven years, before moving to Mars Australia. In 2019, he transitioned into the digital economy taking up a role at a tech startup, Ritual.

Politics
Before standing for parliament himself, Violi worked as an adviser to Senator James Paterson.

Violi was elected to represent Casey on 21 May 2022 replacing the retired Tony Smith. He was elected with a margin of 1.5%.

References 

 

Living people
Year of birth missing (living people)